Stump Pass Beach State Park is a Florida State Park. The park includes the southern peninsula of Manasota Key, and two small islands to the east, Whidden and Peterson Key. The park is located in Englewood, Florida.

Admission and Hours
There is a park use fee. $3.00 per vehicle (containing up to 8 people). Bikes, boats, kayaks, and walkers have a separate fee of $2. Florida state parks are open between 8 a.m. and sundown every day of the year (including holidays). Dogs are not allowed on the beach.

History
Prior to 1971, Stump Pass Beach State Park was known as Port Charlotte Beach State Recreation Area. On May 10, 1970 the park was transferred to the state of Florida from Charlotte county. The park opened to the public in 1971 with no services. Picnic pavilions, a boardwalk, outdoor showers, and restrooms were added to the park in 2000.

Activities
A 1.3-mile hiking trail is available. Beach activities include fishing, shark tooth collection, swimming, sunbathing, paddling, and snorkeling. Ranger-led turtle walks and nature hikes are available in the winter.

References

External links

 Stump Pass Beach State Park at Florida State Parks
 Stump Pass Beach State Park at State Parks
 Stump Pass Beach State Park at Wildernet
 Enjoy-Englewood-Florida.com - Stump Pass Beach

State parks of Florida
Parks in Charlotte County, Florida